HMS M17  was a First World War Royal Navy M15-class monitor.

Design
In addition to her 9.2 inch gun, she also possessed one 12 pounder and one six pound anti-aircraft gun. She was equipped with Triple Expansion steam engines rated to 800 horse power that allowed a top speed of eleven knots. The monitor's crew consisted of sixty nine officers and men.

Construction
HMS M17 was ordered in March 1915, as part of the War Emergency Programme of ship construction. She was laid down at the William Gray shipyard at Hartlepool in March 1915, launched on 12 May 1915, and completed in July 1915.

World War 1
M17 served in the Mediterranean from August 1915 to October 1918, and in the Baltic from March to September 1919.

Disposal
M17 was sold on 12 May 1920 for mercantile service as an oil tanker and renamed 'Todejoe'.

References

Sources

Dittmar, F. J. & Colledge, J. J., "British Warships 1914-1919", (Ian Allan, London, 1972),

External links

 

M15-class monitors
1915 ships
World War I monitors of the United Kingdom
Royal Navy ship names